Dolní Čermná is a market town in Ústí nad Orlicí District in the Pardubice Region of the Czech Republic. It has about 1,400 inhabitants.

Administrative parts
The village of Jakubovice is an administrative part of Dolní Čermná.

Notable people
Jindřich Štyrský (1899–1942), artist

Twin towns – sister cities

Dolní Čermná is twinned with:
 Dzierżoniów, Poland
 Kazár, Hungary
 Liptovská Teplička, Slovakia
 Velykyi Bereznyi, Ukraine

References

External links

Populated places in Ústí nad Orlicí District
Market towns in the Czech Republic